Fitz Herbert (1906 – after 1919) was an American Thoroughbred National Champion racehorse. Bred by Perry Belmont, he was owned by trainer A. J. Joyner, who sold him in early 1908 to Herman Brandt for $3,500. Later that year, Brandt sold the colt to trainer Sam Hildreth.

For Hildreth, he was ridden by jockey Cal Shilling and earned back-to-back United States Horse of the Year awards. His major victories came in long races, something his trainer specialized in. In the 1909 Lawrence Realization Handicap, the horse set a world record for a 1-5/8 mile race. His race record in 1909 was fifteen starts with fourteen wins and one second. His only loss came to a filly named Affliction. Lightly raced in 1910, he won two races and finished second in his other two starts.

In a deal described by The New York Times as the "biggest sale in years," in February 1910 Hildreth sold Fitz Herbert for $40,000 to Charles Kohler, owner of Ramapo Stock Farm in Ho-Ho-Kus, New Jersey. Due to the legislated ban on parimutuel betting by the state of New York, a few weeks later Fitz Herbert and other horses owned by Kohler were shipped to stables at Maisons-Laffitte Racecourse in France where he was conditioned to compete in steeplechase racing. Fitz Herbert later stood at stud at Clarence Mackay Haras de Fresnay farm in Normandy, where he had some success.

References

1906 racehorse births
Racehorses bred in the United States
Racehorses trained in the United States
Horse racing track record setters
American Thoroughbred Horse of the Year
Racehorses trained in France
Thoroughbred family 4-r